Marco Dispaltro (born 2 August 1967) is a Canadian boccia player who competes at international elite competitions. He is a Paralympic bronze medalist in the pairs with Josh Vander Vies and a Parapan American Games champion in the individual events.

References

External links
 
 

1967 births
Living people
Sportspeople from Montreal
Paralympic boccia players of Canada
Boccia players at the 2012 Summer Paralympics
Boccia players at the 2016 Summer Paralympics
Medalists at the 2012 Summer Paralympics
Medalists at the 2011 Parapan American Games
Medalists at the 2015 Parapan American Games
Medalists at the 2019 Parapan American Games